Anthony J. Paulekas Jr. (August 9, 1912 – September 18, 1995) was an American football center in the National Football League for the Green Bay Packers.  He played college football at the Washington & Jefferson College.

In 1974, he was inducted into the Mercer County Hall of Fame.

References

External links
 
 

Washington & Jefferson Presidents football players
Players of American football from Pennsylvania
Green Bay Packers players
Washington & Jefferson College alumni
People from Mercer County, Pennsylvania
1912 births
1995 deaths